Peter Elias (November 23, 1923 – December 7, 2001) was a pioneer in the field of information theory. Born in New Brunswick, New Jersey, he was a member of the Massachusetts Institute of Technology faculty from 1953 to 1991. In 1955, Elias introduced convolutional codes as an alternative to block codes. He also established the binary erasure channel and proposed list decoding of error-correcting codes as an alternative to unique decoding.

Career 
Peter Elias was a member of the Massachusetts Institute of Technology faculty from 1953 to 1991. From 1957 until 1966, he served as one of three founding editors of Information and Control.

Awards 
Elias received the Claude E. Shannon Award of the IEEE Information Theory Society (1977); the Golden Jubilee Award for Technological Innovation of the IEEE Information Theory Society (1998); and the IEEE Richard W. Hamming Medal (2002).

Family background 
Peter Elias was born on November 23, 1923, in New Brunswick, New Jersey. His mother Anna Elias (née Wahrhaftig) was born on April 19, 1897, in New York City. His father Nathaniel Mendel Elias, born on February 21, 1895, worked for Thomas Edison in his Edison, New Jersey, laboratory after graduating from Columbia University with a degree in chemical engineering. His paternal grandparents were Emil Elias and Pepi Pauline Cypres (daughter of Peretz Hacohen Cypres and Lea Breindel Cypres) who married in 1889 in Kraków, Poland.

Death 
Elias died (at age 78) on December 7, 2001, of Creutzfeldt–Jakob disease.

See also 
 Elias coding

References

External links
 
Robert G. Gallager, "Peter Elias", Biographical Memoirs of the National Academy of Sciences (2008)
 Peter Elias papers, MC-0606. Massachusetts Institute of Technology, Department of Distinctive Collections, Cambridge, Massachusetts.

Fellows of the Association for Computing Machinery
American information theorists
Jewish engineers
1923 births
2001 deaths
Massachusetts Institute of Technology alumni
Massachusetts Institute of Technology faculty
Harvard University alumni